The women's singles badminton event at the 2022 Commonwealth Games was held from 3 to 8 August 2022 at the National Exhibition Centre on the Solihull, England. The defending gold medalist was Saina Nehwal of India. Nehwal did not defend her title.

The athletes were drawn into straight knockout stage. The draw for the competition was conducted on 28 July 2022.

Seeds 
The seeds for the tournament were:

  (champion, Gold medalist)
  (final, Silver medalist)
  (Semi-finals, fourth place)
  (Semi-finals, Bronze medalist)

  (quarter-finals)
  (quarter-finals)
  (quarter-finals)
  (quarter-finals)

Results

Finals

Top half

Section 1

Section 2

Bottom half

Section 3

Section 4

References

Women's singles